Sovrn Holdings is an online advertising technology firm based in Boulder, Colorado with offices in San Francisco, San Diego, New York City, and London.
Sovrn is a traditional ad exchange, but it takes the data it gleans from that and supplies it to publishers in the form of a dashboard, to give them the tools to better monetize and engage with their audiences."

John Battelle sold the direct sales arm of Federated Media Publishing to LIN Media in January 2014 and relaunched the company's programmatic advertising business, formerly Lijit Networks, as Sovrn Holdings. Battelle appointed Walter Knapp, the former COO of Federated Media Publishing, to CEO of Sovrn Holdings. According to MediaPost, the sale of Federated Media Publishing allowed "the publisher-side technology company to fully invest in all things programmatic, including real-time bidding (RTB), programmatic direct sales and private marketplaces.

In November 2014, Quantcast ranked Sovrn as the world’s fourth largest publisher network reaching a monthly global audience of over 423 million people with more than 700 million monthly unique visitors. Quantcast also ranked Sovrn as the third largest publisher network in the United States reaching over 201 million people every month in the US.

In September 2016, Sovrn acquired Zemanta's Editorial Assistant and Related Posts Wordpress products, which had over 260,000 Wordpress installs, from New York-based Zemanta Inc. for an undisclosed sum.

In July 2021, Sovrn acquired San Diego-based Proper Media for an undisclosed sum.

References

Companies based in Boulder, Colorado
Digital marketing companies of the United States